Sofia Theodolinda Hahnsson (née Limón; 1 February 1838 – 20 April 1919) was a Finnish writer and translator. She is the first known female author to write in Finnish. She was a significant figure in the literary society of Hämeenlinna. She had published several popular short stories, novels, and social plays, some of which appeared in newspapers.

Life 
Theodolinda was born on 1 February 1838, in Tyrvää, Satakunta, Finland. She was the daughter of pastor Karl Magnus Limón, and his wife Maria Kristina Mollin. She did not attend academic schooling, but was homeschooled by her father. She was married to Johan Adrian Hahnsson in 1864, and moved with his family to Hämeenlinna in 1871 when he got a teaching post at a school in the city. She had a daughter,  née Hahnsson, who would also become a writer. Upon the death of her husband in 1888, Theodolinda moved to Helsinki in 1892 and married Senator Yrjö Sakari Yrjö-Koskinen. She then published under her second married  name of Theodolinda Yrjö-Koskinen. Theodolinda Hahnsson died on 20 April 1919, in Helsinki.

Writing 
Theodolinda's writing represented a romantic idealism tinted with Christianity and patriotism. Her writings also raised social issues such as poverty, and the power of the father in deciding the marriage of the daughter. She is best known for her 1887 novel Huutolaiset, where she describes the lives of two girls caught in the vendue  system of auctioning the poor out to families.  She was most active during the 1870s and 1880s with her writing. After her second marriage, she did translations.

Selected works

Bibliography 
 Forsman, Jaakko; Havu, I; Salovaara, Hannes; Setälä, Vilho; Wecksell, J. A (1927). Pieni tietosanakirja. 3 3 (in Finnish). Helsinki: Otava. p. 1439–1440. .
 Pynsent, Robert B.; Kanikova, Sonia I. (1993). Reader's Encyclopedia of Eastern European Literature. HarperCollins. .
 Lappalainen, Päivi; Rojola, Lea (2007). Women's Voices: Female Authors and Feminist Criticism in the Finnish Literary Tradition. Finnish Literature Society. .
 Godenhjelm, Bernard Fredrik (1896). Handbook of the History of Finnish Literature. Butler.

References 

1838 births
1919 deaths
Finnish women novelists
19th-century Finnish novelists
19th-century Finnish women writers
20th-century Finnish novelists
20th-century Finnish women writers
Finnish translators
19th-century translators
20th-century translators
Writers from Satakunta
Finnish-language writers